Lala Belu is the second studio album by Ethiopian singer-songwriter Hailu Mergia. It was released on 23 February 2018 under Awesome Tapes From Africa.

Release
On 22 November 2017, Mergia announced his first album in 15 years, along with the single "Gum Gum".

Critical reception
Lala Belu was met with "universal acclaim" reviews from critics. At Metacritic, which assigns a weighted average rating out of 100 to reviews from mainstream publications, this release received an average score of 81 based on 12 reviews. Aggregator Album of the Year gave the release a 73 out of 100 based on a critical consensus of 7 reviews. At AnyDecentMusic?, the release was rated 7.2 out of 10 based on 10 reviews.

Timothy Monger of AllMusic described the album as a "lovely and deeply creative record", while explaining "touching on myriad emotions throughout its six tracks, the album is bright and joyful at times and occasionally funky while frequently veering into the more cerebral and introspective territory that marked his early solo years."

Accolades

Track listing

Personnel

Musicians
 Hailu Mergia – primary artist, producer
 Tony Buck – drums
 Mike Majkowski – bass

Production
 Javon Gant – engineer
 Jessica Thompson – mastering

References

2018 albums